Brasilotyphlus dubium is a species of caecilian in the family Caeciliidae. It was described in 2018.

References

dubium
Amphibians described in 2018
Amphibians of Brazil
Endemic fauna of Brazil